Mark McWatt (born 29 September 1947) is a Guyanese writer and former professor of English at University of the West Indies.

Biography
McWatt was born in Guyana, attending many schools throughout the country due to his father's position as a district officer. McWatt attended the University of Toronto (1966–70) and Leeds University, where he studied the works of Wilson Harris and completed a Ph.D. in 1975. He took a position at the University of the West Indies, Cave Hill campus, Barbados, as an assistant lecturer, then moved up to Professor of West Indian Literature in 1999, until retiring in 2007 as Professor Emeritus. 

He was founding editor, in 1986, of the Journal of West Indian Literature and published three collections of poetry, the second of which, The Language of Eldorado (1994), was awarded the Guyana Prize. His first work of fiction, Suspended Sentences, was the winner of a Commonwealth Writers' Prize in 2006, as well as the Casa de las Américas Prize for best book of Caribbean Literature in English or Creole. A review of Suspended Sentences in the Journal of West Indian Literature called it "haunting, magical and profane".

He co-edited the literature compilations Oxford Book of Caribbean Verse and The Caribbean Short Story: Critical Perspectives. 

McWatt has said his poetry was inspired first by the Guyana landscape, and how it can "at once alter and respond to interior states". His poems reflect his views of the natural world and the supernatural, including a vampire of Caribbean folklore ("Ol' Higue"), and of marriage and domesticity ("A Man in the House").

Bibliography

Poetry
 Interiors - Dangaroo Press, 1989
 The Language of Eldorado - Dangaroo Press,1994
 The Journey to Le Repentir - Peepal Tree Press, 2009

Fiction
 Suspended Sentences: Fictions of Atonement - Peepal Tree Press, 2005

As editor
 The Oxford Book of Caribbean Verse - 2005 (edited with Stewart Brown)
 The Caribbean Short Story: Critical Perspectives - edited by Mark McWatt, Lucy Evans, and Emma Smith; Peepal Tree Press, 2011

References

Further reading
 Jane Bryce (October 2010). "Poems of Penitence and Pilgrimage" sx salon, 1. Retrieved 12 April 2017.

20th-century Guyanese writers
1947 births
Alumni of the University of Leeds
Guyanese poets
Guyanese writers
Living people
University of the West Indies academics
University of Toronto alumni